Hawick television relay station is a relay transmitter of Selkirk, situated on top of the Miller's Knowes, in Hawick, covering the whole of the town. It is especially used by people north of the Teviot who cannot receive transmissions from Selkirk. It is owned and operated by Arqiva.

Services listed by frequency

Analogue television
These services were closed down on 20 November 2008. BBC2 Scotland was previously closed on 6 November.

Digital television
BBC A began broadcasting on 6 November 2008, Digital 3&4 on 20 November 2008, and BBC B on 30 November 2010.

External links
Hawick at The Transmission Gallery

Transmitter sites in Scotland
Hawick